Hermanus is a Latinized version of the Germanic masculine given name Herman. It and its less common variant Hermannus have been used in the Low Countries and South Africa as a birth name. Most people use a short form, like Herman, Harm, Harmen, and Manus. Hermanus also is a patronymic surname in South Africa. People with the name include:

Latinized name
Hermannus Alemannus (died 1272), German bishop in Spain and translator of Arabic philosophical works into Latin
Hermannus Contractus (1013–1054), German scholar, composer, music theorist, mathematician, and astronomer
Hermannus Dalmata (c.1100–1160), Istrian philosopher, astronomer, astrologer, mathematician, translator and author
Hermannus de Wartberge (died c.1380), Livonian chronicler
Hermannus Witsius (1636–1708), Dutch theologian
Birth name
Hermanus Angelkot, (1688–1727), Dutch pharmacist, poet and playwright
Hermanus Hendrikus Baanders (1849–1905), Dutch architect
Hermanus Berserik (1921–2002), Dutch painter and print maker
Hermanus Beukes (1913–2004), Namibian politician and activist
Hermanus Blom (1885–1963), Dutch actor, screenwriter and playwright known as Herman Bouber
Hermanus Brockmann (1871–1936), Dutch rower
Hermanus Brood (1946–2001), Dutch musician and painter.
Hermanus van Brussel (1763–1815), Dutch landscape painter and etcher
Hermanus Jacob Coster (1865–1899), Dutch lawyer and Second Boer War lieutenant
Hermanus Johannes de Graaf (1899–1984), Dutch historian of Java
Hermanus Haga (1852–1936), Dutch physicist
Hermanus P. J. B. Heinsbroek (born 1951), Dutch Minister of Economic Affairs
Hermannus Höfte (1884–1961), Dutch rower
Hermanus Koekkoek (1815–1882), Dutch landscape painter
Hermanus Willem Koekkoek (1867–1929), Dutch military scenes painter
Hermanus Ellen Mees (1880–1964), Dutch painter, draftsman, and lithographer
Hermanus Meyer (1733–1791), German-born clergyman of the Dutch Reformed Church in America
Hermanus Numan (1744–1820), Dutch painter, draftsman, and publisher
Hermanus J.A.M. Schaepman (1844–1903), Dutch priest, politician and poet
Hermanus Eliza Verschoor (1791–1877), Dutch liberal politician
Hermanus L. W. Vrauwdeunt (1915–1982), Dutch footballer
Hermanus van Wyk (1835–1905), South African Baster settler in Namibia

Surname
Grant Hermanus (born 1995), South African rugby player
Kartini Hermanus (born 1949), Indonesian military officer
Oliver Hermanus (born 1983), South African film director and writer

See also
Hermanus, a town in South Africa named after the Dutch teacher Hermanus Pieters
Hermanus Magnetic Observatory, a research facility near that town

Dutch masculine given names